is a public university in the town of Ami, Ibaraki, Japan. The school was established in 1995.

External links
 Official website 

Educational institutions established in 1995
Public universities in Japan
Universities and colleges in Ibaraki Prefecture
Ami, Ibaraki
1995 establishments in Japan